The 1994 NASCAR Busch Series began February 19 and ended October 22. David Green of Labonte Motorsports won the championship.

Teams and drivers

Complete schedule

Part-time schedule

Notes: 
 If under "team", the owner's name is listed and in italics, that means the name of the race team that fielded the car is unknown.

Races

Goody's 300 

The Goody's 300 was held February 19 at Daytona International Speedway.  The No. 30 of Michael Waltrip won the pole and ran well until he lost the right half of his rear spoiler late in the race.

Top ten results

 3-Dale Earnhardt
 32-Dale Jarrett
 23-Chad Little
 14-Terry Labonte
 28-Ernie Irvan
 4-Sterling Marlin
 21-Morgan Shepherd
 8-Kenny Wallace
 99-Robert Pressley
 31-Tom Peck

• This was Earnhardt's 21st and final win in the Busch Grand National Series, as well as his fifth straight victory in the Goody's 300, a record that still stands today.

Goodwrench 200 

The Goodwrench 200 was held February 26 at North Carolina Speedway. Robert Pressley won the pole.

Top ten results

 14-Terry Labonte
 7-Harry Gant
 25-Hermie Sadler
 20-Randy LaJoie
 99-Robert Pressley
 31-Tom Peck
 56-Ronald Cooper
 60-Mark Martin
 59-Dennis Setzer
 9-Mike Wallace

Notable DNQ's: Larry Pearson

Hardee's 250 

The Hardee's 250 was held March 5 at Richmond International Raceway.  The No. 44 of David Green won the pole.

Top ten results

 87-Joe Nemechek
 8-Kenny Wallace
 7-Harry Gant
 38-Elton Sawyer
 25-Hermie Sadler
 14-Terry Labonte
 2-Ricky Craven
 60-Mark Martin
 55-Tim Fedewa
 57-Jason Keller

Notable DNQ's: No. 3-Dale Earnhardt

Busch Light 300 

The Busch Light 300 was held March 12 at Atlanta Motor Speedway.  The No. 46 of Shawna Robinson* won the pole.

Top ten results

 7-Harry Gant
 92-Larry Pearson
 35-Randy Porter
 14-Terry Labonte
 72-Tracy Leslie
 97-Joe Bessey
 20-Randy LaJoie
 59-Dennis Setzer
 32-Dale Jarrett
 3-Dale Earnhardt

Notable DNQ's: 25-Hermie Sadler, 38-Elton Sawyer (both bought rides and still competed in the race)

Shawna Robinson became the first woman to win a pole in either of NASCAR's major touring series with this pole.  However, she crashed on the first lap of the race with Joe Nemechek after Mike Wallace made it three-wide going into turn 3.  Both Robinson and Nemechek accused Wallace of claiming that he was going to wreck Robinson, and then doing it just like he said he would. Wallace denied this. No punishment was assessed in the aftermath.

Miller 500 

The Miller 500 was held March 20 at Martinsville Speedway. David Green won the pole.

Top ten results

 14-Terry Labonte
 44-David Green
 8-Kenny Wallace
 20-Randy LaJoie
 75-Doug Heveron
 92-Larry Pearson
 55-Tim Fedewa
 00-Johnny Rumley
 43-Rodney Combs
 05-Tommy Ellis

Mark III Vans 200 

The Mark III Vans 200 was held March 26 at Darlington Raceway. Mark Martin won the pole.

Top ten results

 60-Mark Martin
 92-Larry Pearson
 20-Randy LaJoie
 8-Kenny Wallace
 7-Harry Gant
 3-Dale Earnhardt
 30-Michael Waltrip
 29-Phil Parsons
 55-Tim Fedewa
 25-Hermie Sadler

Sundrop 400 

The Sundrop 400 was held April 3 at Hickory Motor Speedway. David Green won the pole.

Top ten results

 2-Ricky Craven
 20-Randy LaJoie
 44-David Green
 74-Johnny Benson
 6-Tommy Houston
 31-Tom Peck
 72-Tracy Leslie
 00-Johnny Rumley
 25-Hermie Sadler
 99-Robert Pressley -1

Goody's 250 

The Goody's 250 was held April 9 at Bristol Motor Speedway.  The No. 60 of Mark Martin* won the pole.

Top ten results

 44-David Green
 6-Tommy Houston
 17-Jeff Green
 32-Dale Jarrett
 63-Jim Bown
 92-Larry Pearson
 7-Harry Gant
 82-Derrike Cope
 64-Phil Parsons
 43-Rodney Combs

Mark Martin was leading this race at the white flag under caution and had the race won.  Apparently confused by other drivers (Tommy Houston and Tracy Leslie) pulling alongside and waving to him like the race was already over, Martin pulled off the track to go to victory lane approximately 400 feet short of the finish line.  This gifted David Green his only victory of 1994. It was the first time in NASCAR history that a winner leading at the yellow flag accidentally gave the race away to another driver, but the second time in NASCAR history that a driver mistakenly thought that the race was over one lap too early, therefore dropping a spot or more in the final results (the first was Cale Yarborough in 1984 at Daytona).

Pantry Stores 300 

The final Pantry Stores 300 was held April 30 at Orange County Speedway.  The No. 57 of Jason Keller won the pole.

Top ten results

 25-Hermie Sadler
 59-Dennis Setzer
 8-Kenny Wallace
 74-Johnny Benson -1
 2-Ricky Craven -1
 05-Tommy Ellis -1
 63-Jim Bown -1
 92-Larry Pearson -1
 02-Michael Ritch -2
 08-Bobby Dotter -3
This was Sadler's last career NASCAR Busch Series victory.
 According to a 1995 issue of NASCAR Winston Cup Scene, there was a race at Orange County Speedway scheduled for 1995, but it was cancelled before it could be run.

NE Chevy 250 

The NE Chevy 250 was held May 7 at New Hampshire International Speedway.  The No. 33 of Bobby Labonte won the pole.

Top ten results

 82-Derrike Cope
 08-Bobby Dotter
 52-Ken Schrader
 8-Kenny Wallace
 23-Chad Little
 44-David Green
 92-Larry Pearson
 59-Dennis Setzer
 71-Kevin Lepage -1
 34-Mike McLaughlin -2

Meridian Advantage 200 

The Meridian Advantage 200 was held May 22 at Nazareth Speedway. Kenny Wallace won the pole.

Top ten results

 2-Ricky Craven
 38-Elton Sawyer
 9-Mike Wallace
 44-David Green
 34-Mike McLaughlin
 08-Bobby Dotter
 55-Tim Fedewa
 8-Kenny Wallace
 59-Dennis Setzer
 72-Tracy Leslie

Champion 300 

The Champion 300 was held May 28 at Charlotte Motor Speedway.  The No. 88 of Mike Skinner won the pole.

Top ten results

 29-Phil Parsons
 60-Mark Martin
 30-Michael Waltrip
 27-Roy Payne
 28-Ernie Irvan -1
 99-Robert Pressley -1
 56-Ronald Cooper -1
 14-Terry Labonte -1
 34-Mike McLaughlin -1
 97-Joe Bessey -1
This was Parsons' last career NASCAR victory.

Goodwrench/Delco 200 

The Goodwrench/Delco 200 was held June 4 at Dover International Speedway. Ricky Craven won the pole.

Top ten results

 9-Mike Wallace*
 14-Terry Labonte
 60-Mark Martin
 64-Jimmy Spencer
 2-Ricky Craven
 55-Tim Fedewa
 99-Robert Pressley
 57-Jason Keller
 87-Joe Nemechek
 72-Tracy Leslie

This was Mike Wallace's first career NASCAR Busch Grand National Series victory.

Carolina Pride/Budweiser 250 

The Carolina Pride/Budweiser 250 was held June 11 at Myrtle Beach Speedway.  The No. 57 of Jason Keller won the pole.

Top ten results

 38-Elton Sawyer*
 8-Kenny Wallace
 2-Ricky Craven
 99-Robert Pressley
 23-Chad Little
 44-David Green
 08-Bobby Dotter
 63-Jim Bown
 43-Rodney Combs
 92-Larry Pearson

This was Elton Sawyer's first career NASCAR Busch Grand National Series victory.

Fay's 150 

The Fay's 150 was held June 25 at Watkins Glen International. Ricky Craven won the pole.

Top ten results

 14-Terry Labonte
 08-Bobby Dotter*
 72-Tracy Leslie
 44-David Green
 25-Hermie Sadler
 99-Robert Pressley
 2-Ricky Craven
 23-Chad Little
 92-Larry Pearson
 46-Shawna Robinson

Bobby Dotter suffered injuries in a crash during the Goodwrench/Delco 200 at Dover.  Dotter started the 150 mile event, but ended up requiring relief from road racer Scott Lagasse.  Since Dotter started the race, he got credit for the finish.

Havoline 250 

The Havoline 250 was held July 3 at The Milwaukee Mile. David Green won the pole.

Top ten results

 9-Mike Wallace
 44-David Green
 74-Johnny Benson
 33-Bobby Labonte
 8-Kenny Wallace
 34-Mike McLaughlin
 23-Chad Little
 38-Elton Sawyer
 59-Dennis Setzer
 2-Ricky Craven

Ford Credit 300 

The Ford Credit 300 was held July 16 at South Boston Speedway. David Green won the pole.

Top ten results

 59-Dennis Setzer
 25-Hermie Sadler
 74-Johnny Benson
 44-David Green
 23-Chad Little
 99-Robert Pressley
 72-Tracy Leslie
 9-Nathan Buttke
 79-Dave Rezendes
 63-Jim Bown

Fram Filter 300K 

The Fram Filter 300K was held July 23 at Talladega Superspeedway. Jeff Purvis won the pole.

Top ten results

 52-Ken Schrader
 14-Terry Labonte
 3-Dale Earnhardt
 4-Sterling Marlin
 51-Jeff Purvis
 23-Chad Little
 34-Mike McLaughlin
 9-Mike Wallace
 25-Hermie Sadler
 72-Tracy Leslie

The Pantry 300 

The Pantry 300 was held July 31 at Hickory Motor Speedway. David Green won the pole.

Top ten results

 59-Dennis Setzer
 8-Kenny Wallace
 44-David Green
 75-Doug Heveron
 92-Larry Pearson
 25-Hermie Sadler
 2-Ricky Craven
 23-Chad Little
 08-Bobby Dotter
 55-Tim Fedewa
This was Setzer's last career NASCAR Busch Series victory.

Kroger 200 

The Kroger 200 was held Friday night August 5 at Indianapolis Raceway Park. David Green won the pole.

Top ten results

 9-Mike Wallace
 6-Tommy Houston
 34-Mike McLaughlin
 59-Dennis Setzer
 23-Chad Little
 2-Ricky Craven
 44-David Green
 8-Kenny Wallace
 57-Jason Keller
 08-Bobby Dotter

After several years of mid-summer races, and various dates ranging from June to August, in 1994 the Kroger 200 was permanently planted as a support race for the new Winston Cup Brickyard 400 at nearby Indianapolis Motor Speedway. With the Brickyard 400 being held on a Saturday, the Kroger 200 was scheduled for Friday night. A huge sell-out crowd for the Kroger 200 saw extra bleachers erected at the oval, with thousands of additional fans in town that weekend for the inaugural stock car race at Indy.

Detroit Gasket 200 

The Detroit Gasket 200 was held August 20 at Michigan International Speedway. Derrike Cope won the pole.

Top ten results

 33-Bobby Labonte
 23-Chad Little
 60-Mark Martin
 34-Mike McLaughlin
 64-Dick Trickle
 59-Dennis Setzer
 55-Tim Fedewa
 25-Hermie Sadler
 92-Larry Pearson
 57-Jason Keller

Food City 250 

The Food City 250 was held August 26 at Bristol Motor Speedway. Harry Gant won the pole.

Top ten results

 8-Kenny Wallace
 52-Ken Schrader
 44-David Green
 2-Ricky Craven
 64-Dick Trickle
 57-Jason Keller
 72-Tracy Leslie
 74-Johnny Benson
 14-Terry Labonte
 28-Mark Martin

For this race, Mark Martin - instead of driving his normal Roush Racing #60 Winn-Dixie Ford Thunderbird - substituted in the #28 car normally driven by Ernie Irvan following Irvan's severe injuries following a crash practicing for the 1994 GM Goodwrench Dealer 400 in the Winston Cup Series.

Gatorade 200 

The Gatorade 200 was held September 3 at Darlington Raceway. Randy LaJoie won the pole.

Top ten results

 60-Mark Martin
 32-Dale Jarrett
 9-Mike Wallace
 74-Johnny Benson
 23-Chad Little
 34-Mike McLaughlin
 92-Larry Pearson
 2-Ricky Craven
 38-Elton Sawyer
 59-Dennis Setzer

Autolite 250 

The Autolite 250 was held September 9 at Richmond International Raceway. Jason Keller won the pole.

Top ten results

 8-Kenny Wallace
 60-Mark Martin
 3-Dale Earnhardt
 14-Terry Labonte
 31-Steve Grissom
 74-Johnny Benson
 30-Michael Waltrip
 44-David Green
 92-Larry Pearson
 33-Bobby Labonte

SplitFire 200 

The SplitFire 200 was held September 17 at Dover International Speedway. Harry Gant won the pole.

Top ten results

 74-Johnny Benson
 7-Harry Gant
 2-Ricky Craven
 57-Jason Keller
 25-Hermie Sadler
 20-Randy LaJoie
 99-Bobby Hillin Jr.
 29-Phil Parsons
 14-Terry Labonte
 97-Joe Bessey

All Pro 300 

The All Pro 300 was held October 8 at Charlotte Motor Speedway. Mark Martin won the pole.

Top ten results

 14-Terry Labonte
 60-Mark Martin
 82-Derrike Cope
 23-Chad Little
 38-Elton Sawyer
 63-Jim Bown
 4-Sterling Marlin
 2-Ricky Craven
 20-Jimmy Hensley
 76-Jeff Green

This was Dale Earnhardt's last Busch Series race. He dropped out after just five laps due to engine failure.

Advance Auto 500 

The Advance Auto 500 was held October 16 at Martinsville Speedway. David Green won the pole.

Top ten results

 8-Kenny Wallace
 44-David Green
 9-Mike Wallace
 55-Tim Fedewa
 23-Chad Little
 14-Terry Labonte
 08-Bobby Dotter
 2-Ricky Craven
 6-Tommy Houston
 57-Jason Keller

 This was the final race at Martinsville Speedway for the Busch Series until 2006 and 2020.

AC-Delco 200 

The AC-Delco 200 was held October 22 at North Carolina Speedway. David Green won the pole.

Top ten results

 60-Mark Martin
 3-Michael Waltrip
 2-Ricky Craven
 7-Harry Gant
 23-Chad Little
 8-Kenny Wallace
 9-Mike Wallace
 74-Johnny Benson
 20-Randy LaJoie
 43-Robert Pressley

This was the final time that V6 engines were used in the Busch Series. They would make the switch to V8 power in 1995.

Final points standings 

David Green - 3725
Ricky Craven - 3679 
Chad Little - 3662
Kenny Wallace - 3554 
Hermie Sadler - 3466
Johnny Benson - 3303
Bobby Dotter - 3299
Larry Pearson - 3277
Dennis Setzer - 3273
Tim Fedewa - 3125
Tracy Leslie - 3088
Robert Pressley - 3043 
Mike McLaughlin - 2986
Elton Sawyer - 2873
Jim Bown - 2853
Randy LaJoie - 2837
Jason Keller - 2767
Terry Labonte - 2720
Mike Wallace - 2679
Mark Martin - 2132
Rodney Combs - 2131
Dave Rezendes - 1992
Harry Gant - 1939
Kevin Lepage - 1865
Phil Parsons - 1839
Stevie Reeves - 1817
Doug Heveron - 1780
Tommy Houston - 1658
Roy Payne - 1640
Randy Porter - 1525
Dirk Stephens - 1317
Derrike Cope - 1314
Johnny Rumley - 1276
Dale Earnhardt - 1188
Bobby Labonte - 1188
Dale Jarrett - 1176
Joe Bessey - 1152 
Ken Schrader - 1128
Tom Peck - 1090
Joe Nemechek - 1065
Michael Waltrip - 983
Mike Garvey - 963
Steve Grissom -  921
Sterling Marlin - 810 
Morgan Shepherd - 780
Tommy Ellis - 753
Shawna Robinson - 742
Robbie Reiser - 735
Nathan Buttke - 716
Ronald Cooper - 642

Full Drivers' Championship

(key) Bold – Pole position awarded by time. Italics – Pole position set by owner's points. * – Most laps led.

Rookie of the Year 
Grand Rapids, Michigan native Johnny Benson won the Busch Series Rookie of the Year award in 1994, winning once and finishing sixth in points, followed closely by Dennis Setzer, a two-time winner on the circuit. Kevin Lepage and Stevie Reeves were the only others drivers who attempted the season on a full-time basis that season.

See also 
1994 NASCAR Winston Cup Series
1994–95 NASCAR SuperTruck Series exhibition races

External links 
Busch Series standings and statistics for 1994

Busch Series
NASCAR Xfinity Series seasons
NASCAR Busch Series
1994 in American sports